In enzymology, a Fas-activated serine/threonine kinase is an enzyme that catalyzes the chemical reaction

ATP + [Fas-activated serine/threonine protein]  ADP + [Fas-activated serine/threonine phosphoprotein]

Thus, the two substrates of this enzyme are ATP and Fas-activated serine/threonine protein, whereas its two products are ADP and Fas-activated serine/threonine phosphoprotein.

This enzyme belongs to the family of transferases, specifically those transferring phosphorus-containing groups protein-serine/threonine kinases. The systematic name of this enzyme class is ATP:[Fas-activated serine/threonine protein] phosphotransferase. Other names in common use include FAST, FASTK, and STK10.

References

 
 

EC 2.7.11
Enzymes of unknown structure